Emmy Raver-Lampman (born Emily Christine Raver Lampman, September 5, 1988) is an American actress and singer. She began her career working in musical theater, and has performed in various Broadway and national touring productions such as Hair, Jekyll & Hyde, Wicked, and Hamilton. She has played Allison Hargreeves in the Netflix series The Umbrella Academy  since 2019.

Early life
Raver-Lampman was born and raised in Norfolk, Virginia. She was adopted as a newborn; her mother Sharon is a professor at Old Dominion University, while her father Greg is a writer and teacher. She was raised an only child, has traveled widely (over 50 countries) and lived in the Czech Republic, Ukraine and India when she was young due to her mother's work. She has a half-sister, who is her junior by twenty years.

She attended a performing arts high school, Governor's School for the Arts, as well as Maury High in Norfolk. She then attended Marymount Manhattan College in New York City. She began working as a professional actress while in school and began studying remotely for her junior year. She landed a part in a production of Hair, and she left her course temporarily with just a semester left before graduation, but eventually returned to graduate with a Bachelor of Arts in Theater in 2012.

Career 
Raver-Lampman's career began in musical theatre. Her first professional theater role was in a May 2010 production of Children of Eden, produced by the Astoria Performing Arts Center. She auditioned for the musical while she was a sophomore at college and won a leading role. She then auditioned for and subsequently joined the 2010 national tour of Hair, from which she earned her Equity card.

Raver-Lampman made her Broadway debut in Summer 2011, when Hair made a return to Broadway with its touring production. She left Hair when the production closed on Broadway that September. The following fall, Raver-Lampman joined the 3rd national tour of the musical Jekyll & Hyde as an ensemble member and understudy for the lead role, Lucy Harris. The production transferred to Broadway in April 2013 for a two-month limited engagement but closed after a month. Later in 2013, Raver-Lampman was cast in the Broadway original production of A Night with Janis Joplin. She performed as a swing until the show closed in February 2014 and was subsequently cast in the 1st U.S. tour of the musical Wicked as a standby for the lead role of Elphaba.

Following her one-year contract with Wicked, Raver-Lampman returned to New York in March 2015, and later auditioned for one of the two ensemble roles that Hamilton was adding to its show after its Off-Broadway run. She was cast and became part of the original ensemble cast of Hamilton on Broadway, as well as an understudy for all three lead female roles: Angelica, Eliza, and Peggy/Maria Reynolds. Hamilton opened in August 2015. In September 2015, Raver-Lampman was part of a star-studded reading of an original rock musical titled Galileo. In December of that year, she took part in an MCC Theatre workshop of Alice By Heart.

In January 2016, it was announced that she was cast as Pearl Krabs in the Chicago production tryout of the musical SpongeBob SquarePants. She left Hamilton in April 2016, and is one of the two original cast members who did not take part in the filming of the production. She returned to Hamilton later that year as an original member of the show's Chicago production, which began previews in September 2016. In March 2017, she joined the show's first national tour, starring as Angelica. She toured with the show until the end of 2017, performing in San Francisco and Los Angeles.

In late 2019, it was announced that she would be joining her former Hamilton castmate Solea Pfeiffer as co-stars of the new original musical Gun & Powder, directed by Robert O'Hara. The show had a month-long regional engagement in Arlington, Virginia, which opened on January 28, 2020.

Raver-Lampman landed her first major television role in 2017, portraying Allison Hargreeves in The Umbrella Academy, opposite actors Elliot Page and Tom Hopper, among others. The show was filmed during the first half of 2018 and was released on Netflix in February 2019. The show was Netflix's third most popular series in 2019, with more than 45 million viewers. Raver-Lampman filmed the second season over five months in 2019, with the season premiering in July 2020.

Throughout 2019, she also had guest roles in television shows like A Million Little Things and Jane the Virgin. Raver-Lampman was featured on the 2019 album Seven Nights in Chicago by Daveed Diggs and Rafael Casal. In July 2020, it was announced that Raver-Lampman would be replacing Kristen Bell as the voice of Molly Tillerman in the Apple TV+ show Central Park. The announcement came after Bell resigned from her role, due to a controversy over her performance as a mixed-race character. Raver-Lampman voiced Molly in the second season of the series.

Personal life 
Raver-Lampman is in a relationship with Daveed Diggs, whom she met in 2015 while performing together in Hamilton.

Filmography

Film

Television

Theater

Discography 

 Hamilton (Original Broadway Cast Recording) (2015); company member
 Bonnie and Clyde and a Whole Lotta Jazz (Live at 54 Below) (2016), composed by Frank Wildhorn; featured vocalist
 SpongeBob SquarePants, The New Musical (2017); company member and featured on "Daddy Knows Best"
 Blindspotting: The Collin EP (2018), by Daveed Diggs and Rafael Casal; featured artist on "Something in the Water"
 The Umbrella Academy (Original Series Soundtrack) (2019), composed by Jeff Russo; featured vocalist on "Stormy Weather"
 Seven Nights in Chicago (2019), by Daveed Diggs and Rafael Casal; featured artist on "At this Point" and "No Feels"
 The Good & The Bad (2019), by Anthony Ramos; background vocalist on "Come Back Home"
 Three Points of Contact (2019), concept album composed by Ryan Scott Oliver; featured artist on "Bleed You Dry"

References

External links
 
 
 

21st-century American actresses
Living people
1988 births
Actresses from Virginia
African-American actresses
American musical theatre actresses
Singers from Virginia
Marymount Manhattan College alumni
Actors from Norfolk, Virginia
Musicians from Norfolk, Virginia
21st-century American singers
21st-century American women singers
American adoptees
American film actresses
American television actresses
20th-century African-American women singers
21st-century African-American women singers